Cattle Colony also known as Bhains Kalony, is a neighborhood in the Malir District of Karachi, Pakistan. It was previously a part of Bin Qasim Town, which was disbanded in 2011.This neighbourhood of Karachi is the centre of cattle and meat trade in Karachi. The Cattle Colony is the dairy products shopping and supply centre of  Karachi. There are also many abattoirs and meat warehouses located in the Cattle Colony.

Demography
The ethnic groups in Cattle Colony include Sindhis, Muhajir, Punjabis, Kashmiris, Seraikis, Pakhtuns, Balochs, Brahuis, Memons etc.

References

External links 
 Karachi Website.

Neighbourhoods of Karachi
Bin Qasim Town